This is a list of Grade I listed buildings in Lancashire, England.

In the United Kingdom, the term "listed building" refers to a building or other structure officially designated as being of special architectural, historical or cultural significance. These buildings are in three grades: Grade I consists of buildings of outstanding architectural or historical interest. Buildings in England are listed by the Secretary of State for Culture, Media and Sport on recommendations provided by English Heritage, which also determines the grading.

Blackburn with Darwen

|}

Blackpool

|}

Burnley

|}

Chorley

|}

Fylde

|}

Hyndburn

|}

Lancaster

|}

Pendle

|}

Preston

|}

Ribble Valley

|}

South Ribble

|}

West Lancashire

|}

Wyre

|}

Notes

References
Note: The Heritage Gateway website is published by the Heritage Gateway Partners, namely English Heritage, the Institute of Historic Building Conservation, and The Association of Local Government Archaeological Officers (ALGAO:England) 
Footnotes

Sources

See also

 Grade II* listed buildings in Lancashire
 Grade I listed churches in Lancashire
 Scheduled monuments in Lancashire

 
Lancashire
 Grade I